"Anytime" is a song by the American sibling group, The Jets. It was written by Rupert Holmes, best known for his 1979 hit "Escape (The Piña Colada Song)".

"Anytime" was released as the final single from their multi-platinum album, Magic. It reached number 35 on the Billboard Adult Contemporary chart in late 1988.

Charts

References

1988 singles
The Jets (band) songs
Pop ballads
1987 songs
Songs written by Rupert Holmes
MCA Records singles
1980s ballads